Rodriguez ( in Peninsular Spain or  in Latin America) is a Hispanic surname meaning "son of Rodrigo".  It is often rendered without the accent mark, primarily outside Spanish-speaking countries. It may refer to:


People
 Rodríguez (surname), people with the surname or mononym Rodríguez
 Rodrigues (surname), people with the surname Rodrigues

Music
 Sixto Rodriguez, singer-songwriter who records and performs under the mononym Rodriguez
 Rodriguez (band), American rock band active in the mid-late 1990s
 Adrián Rodríguez, Spanish actor and singer
 Adrian Rodriguez (DJ), German trance producer and DJ, known as Rodriguez
 Adrian Rodriguez (musician), American musician, bassist of The Airborne Toxic Event
 Magan & Rodriguez, Spanish musical duo 
 Martínez Rodríguez, Cuban vocalist who collaborated with Tacabro

Place names
 Rodrigues Island, a dependency of Mauritius in the Indian Ocean
 Rodriguez, California, alternate name of Muroc, California, United States
 Rodriguez, Rizal, municipality in the Philippines

American court cases
 San Antonio Independent School District v. Rodriguez (1973), a decision in which the United States Supreme Court ruled that the Constitution does not confer a fundamental right to receive an education
 Rodriguez v. United States (2015), a decision in which the United States Supreme Court ruled that, without reasonable suspicion, police officers may not extend the length of a traffic stop to conduct a dog sniff

See also
 Rodríguez Saá, Argentine family
 Rodrigues (disambiguation)
 Rodriquez (disambiguation)
 Justice Rodriguez (disambiguation)